Gene Robinson may refer to:

Gene Robinson (born 1947), American episcopal bishop
Gene E. Robinson (born 1955), American entomologist

See also
Eugene Robinson (disambiguation)
Jean Robinson (1899–1986), English politician
Jean Louis Robinson, Malagasy politician